Donald Gillen (born December 24, 1960) is a Canadian former professional ice hockey right winger who played in 35 National Hockey League (NHL) games with the Philadelphia Flyers and Hartford Whalers. He scored a game in his first NHL game with the Flyers against Edmonton on January 27, 1980.

Career statistics

Regular season and playoffs

Awards
 WHL Second All-Star Team – 1980

External links
 

1960 births
Living people
Binghamton Whalers players
Brandon Wheat Kings players
Canadian ice hockey right wingers
Hartford Whalers players
Ice hockey people from Saskatchewan
Maine Mariners players
Philadelphia Flyers draft picks
Philadelphia Flyers players
Weyburn Red Wings players